The 3rd Troop of Horse Guards was formed in 1658 as the 2nd, or The Duke of York's Troop of Horse Guards from followers of Charles II in exile in Holland. In 1670, it became the 3rd Troop of Horse Guards and was absorbed by the 1st Troop of Horse Guards in 1746.

Colonels and former names of the 3rd Troop of Horse Guards
 1658-1660 Unknown
 1660-1665 Col. Charles, Earl of Falmouth —Berkeley's or Earl of Falmouth's Horse Guards
 1665-1685 Lt-Gen. Louis, Earl of Feversham —Duras' or Earl of Feversham's Horse Guards
 1685-1688 Gen. John, Baron Churchill —Churchill's Horse Guards
 1688-1689 Lt-Gen. James, Duke of Berwick —FitzJames's or Duke of Berwick's Horse Guards
 1689-1692 Gen. John, Earl of Marlborough (reappointed) —Earl of Marlborough's Horse Guards
 1692-1703 Gen. Richard, Earl Rivers —Savage's or Lord Colchester's or Earl Rivers' Horse Guards
 1703-1715 Lt-Gen. Charles, Earl of Arran —Earl of Arran's Horse Guards
 1715-1733 Gen. George, Earl of Cholmondeley —Earl of Cholmondeley's Horse Guards
 1733-1745 Gen. Willem, Earl of Albemarle —Keppel's or Earl of Albemarle's Horse Guards
 1745-1746 F.M. James, Baron Tyrawley —O'Hara's or Lord Tyrawley's Horse Guards

References
Archive of regiments.org page

Regiments of the British Army
1658 establishments in the Dutch Republic
Military units and formations established in 1658
Household Cavalry